Francis G. Welch Stadium, also known as Jones Field at Welch Stadium or Welch Stadium, is a sport stadium in Emporia, Kansas. The facility is primarily used by the Emporia State University football and track & field teams and Emporia High School football. It is named to honor long-time Emporia State coach and athletic director Fran Welch. The facility was one of the first on the NCAA Division II level to offer enclosed skyboxes and is still one of only a few across the nation.

Stadium history
The first football game at Welch Stadium came on Armistice Day in 1937. The Hornets tied St. Benedict's College by a score of 20-20. More than 6,000 fans saw the first game in the facility.  The largest crowd on record for a football game was the 1973 game against Northern Colorado.  The record crowd of 10,000 saw the Hornets to a 10-0 victory as the Hornets vaulted to a No. 3 ranking in the NAIA.

Top crowds at Welch Stadium

Other uses
The stadium is used by the local high school for games, college and community events, Special Olympics and other sporting events. The stadium currently hosts the Kansas State High School Activities Association Class 5A state championship game, Emporia High School Football games and the Kansas Shrine Bowl all-star game every four years (the site currently rotates between Emporia, Pittsburg, Manhattan, and Hays). 

Welch Stadium served three times as the site for the NCAA Division II Outdoor Track & Field Championships.

References

College football venues
Sports venues in Kansas
Buildings and structures in Lyon County, Kansas
American football venues in Kansas
Emporia State Hornets football